Maharaj Ji, Maharaji, or similar, may refer to:

 Prem Rawat (born 1957), teacher of a meditation practice he calls Knowledge
 Guru Maharaj Ji (Nigeria), spiritual leader in Nigeria
 Neem Karoli Baba (died 1973), Hindu guru and devotee of the Hindu deity Ram
 Rajinder Singh (Sant Mat) (born 1946), head of Science of Spirituality
 Satpal Maharaj (born 1951), member of the lower house of the Parliament of India for the Indian National Congress party

See also 
 Maharaja (disambiguation)